Ravi Belagere (15 March 1958 – 13 November 2020) was an Indian writer and journalist based in Bangalore, Karnataka. He was the editor of the Kannada-language tabloid Hai Bangalore and fortnightly magazine O Manase. He founded Bhavana Prakashana, Prarthana School and Bhavana Audio Reach.

Personal life

Early life
Belagere was born on 15 March 1958 at Sathyanarayanapete, in Bellary. His mother's name is Parvathamma and his father was a writer. He studied his high school education from Siddhaganga High School, Tumkur for couple of years and he failed in SSLC. Later, he completed his master's degree in history and archaeology from Veerashaiva College, Bellary.

Married life
Belagere has been married twice. His first wife is Lalitha and the second wife is Yashomati, who was his colleague at Hai Bangalore office. His first wife has three children namely Chethana Belagere (daughter), Bhavana Belagere (daughter) and Karna (son). His second wife Yashomati has a son named Himavanth. He was an ardent fan of Khushwant Singh and he said he was attracted to leftist ideology and he had no political leanings.

Career
Belagere started his career as a lecturer of history, working as a lecturer of history in Bellary, Hassan and Hubli before heading to Bengaluru in 1984. After coming to Bengaluru, he started his own newspaper Hai Bangalore on September 25, 1995 along with R. T. Vittalamurthy, Ra. Somanath, Jogi and I. H. Sangam Dev which he published from his Padmanabhanagar office in Bengaluru. The columns like Love Lavike, Bottom Item and Khaas Baat apart from Papigala Lokadalli which was about the underworld, created many admirers and his paper was the largest circulated newspaper over the five years. After this success, he started a magazine O Manase which focused on difficulties and troubles of young people. Later, he produced several TV programs and acted in some movies.

Literary works

Media works
 He was the producer and narrator of the crime investigation show Crime Diary which aired on ETV Kannada and he has also given his voice for the movie Deadly Soma
 He hosted a TV program Endhu Mareyada Haadu, Break fast which aired on Janashri TV
 He has acted in movies like Ganda Hendathi, Madesha and Vaarasdhara and also he has played the role of a judge in Muktha Muktha serial
 He has also produced a TV programs such as Night Beat Crime, Heli Hogu Karana which is based on his own novel on Suvarna TV
 He has also conducted a radio program Bel Belagge Ravi Belagere on Akashvani.
He was a participant in Bigg Boss Kannada seventh season.

Awards and honours

Controversies
 Controversial article on actress Rupini
He wrote a controversial article on Rupini (actress) which invited a huge criticism.
 Movie on HDK and Radhika
He tried directing the movie Mukhyamantri I Love You which was based on the love story of H D Kumaraswamy and actress Radhika Kumaraswamy. But the movie didn't hit the screen as H. D. Deve Gowda brought the stay on the movie release.
 Spat with Prathap Simha and criticisim of Vijaya Karnataka
In December 2010, he made a derogatory comment on Pratap Simha at the time when Pratap Simha was a writer at Vijaya Karnataka and it led to the resignation of Pratap Simha, then the editor-in-chief Vishweshwar Bhat, P. Thayagaraj and several others. After that, Pratap Simha hits back to Ravi Belagere on his website and the spat between the two continued for a while.
Extra-marital relationships
A magazine named Duniya printed an alleged love letter written by Ravi Belagere to a 22-year-old girl begging for love. Also, the magazine had an article saying that it had received many such cases.
Copyright issues
He had a spat with the producers of the movies such as Bheema Theeradalli and Om(Kannada film) over alleged copyright infringement of his works.

Death
Ravi died at 2:30 AM on 13 November 2020 due to heart attack in Bangalore. He was 62.

References

Further reading
 The Hindu : Karnataka / Bellary News : Jail for Ravi Belagere
 The Hindu : Karnataka / Hassan News : Journalist restrained from releasing film
 The Hindu : Editor of weekly opens fire at gang

External links
 Official website
  Official website
 Articles by Belagere
 Ourkarnataka
Official YouTube Channel
Namma Nammalli : Vijayavani newspaper articles by Ravi Belagere

1958 births
2020 deaths
Indian editors
Writers from Bangalore
Kannada-language journalists
Journalists from Karnataka
20th-century Indian journalists
Recipients of the Rajyotsava Award 2008